Homo heidelbergensis (also H. sapiens heidelbergensis) is an extinct species or subspecies of archaic human which existed during the Middle Pleistocene. It was subsumed as a subspecies of H. erectus in 1950 as H. e. heidelbergensis, but towards the end of the century, it was more widely classified as its own species. It is debated whether or not to constrain H. heidelbergensis to only Europe or to also include African and Asian specimens, and this is further confounded by the type specimen (Mauer 1) being a jawbone, because jawbones feature few diagnostic traits and are generally missing among Middle Pleistocene specimens. Thus, it is debated if some of these specimens could be split off into their own species or a subspecies of H. erectus. Because the classification is so disputed, the Middle Pleistocene is often called the "muddle in the middle."

H. heidelbergensis is regarded as a chronospecies, evolving from an African form of H. erectus (sometimes called H. ergaster). By convention, H. heidelbergensis is placed as the most recent common ancestor between modern humans (H. sapiens or H. s. sapiens) and Neanderthals (H. neanderthalensis or H. s. neanderthalensis). Many specimens assigned to H. heidelbergensis likely existed well after the modern human/Neanderthal split. In the Middle Pleistocene, brain size averaged about 1,200 cubic centimetres (cc), comparable to modern humans. Like Neanderthals, they had wide chests and were robust overall.

The Middle Pleistocene of Africa and Europe features the advent of Late Acheulian technology, diverging from that of earlier and contemporary H. erectus, and probably issuing from increasing intelligence. Fire likely became an integral part of daily life after 400,000 years ago, and this roughly coincides with more permanent and widespread occupation of Europe (above 45°N), and the appearance of hafting technology to create spears. H. heidelbergensis may have been able to carry out coordinated hunting strategies, and consequently they seem to have had a higher dependence on meat.

Taxonomy

Research history 

The first fossil, Mauer 1 (a jawbone), was discovered by a worker in Mauer, southeast of Heidelberg, Germany, in 1907. It was formally described the next year by German anthropologist Otto Schoetensack, who made it the type specimen of a new species, Homo heidelbergensis. He split this off as a new species primarily because of the mandible's archaicness—in particular its enormous size—and it was the then-oldest human jaw in the European fossil record at 640,000 years old. The mandible is well preserved, missing only the left premolars, part of the 1st left molar, the tip of the left coronoid process (at the jaw hinge), and fragments of the mid-section as the jaw was found in 2 pieces and had to be glued together. It may have belonged to a young adult based on slight wearing on the 3rd molar. In 1921, the skull Kabwe 1 was discovered by Swiss miner Tom Zwiglaar in Kabwe, Zambia (at the time Broken Hill, Northern Rhodesia), and was assigned to a new species, "H. rhodesiensis", by English palaeontologist Arthur Smith Woodward. These were two of the many putative species of Middle Pleistocene Homo which were described throughout the first half of the 20th century. In the 1950s, Ernst Mayr had entered the field of anthropology, and, surveying a "bewildering diversity of names," decided to define only three species of Homo: "H. transvaalensis" (the australopithecines), H. erectus (including the Mauer mandible, and various putative African and Asian taxa) and Homo sapiens (including anything younger than H. erectus, such as modern humans and Neanderthals). Mayr defined them as a sequential lineage, with each species evolving into the next (chronospecies). Though later Mayr changed his opinion on the australopithecines (recognising Australopithecus), his more conservative view of archaic human diversity became widely adopted in the subsequent decades.

Though H. erectus is still maintained as a highly variable, widespread and long-lasting species, it is still much debated whether or not sinking all Middle Pleistocene remains into it is justifiable. Mayr's lumping of H. heidelbergensis was first opposed by American anthropologist Francis Clark Howell in 1960. In 1974, British physical anthropologist Chris Stringer pointed out similarities between the Kabwe 1 and the Greek Petralona skulls to the skulls of modern humans (H. sapiens or H. s. sapiens) and Neanderthals (H. neanderthalensis or H. s. neanderthalensis). So, Stringer assigned them to Homo sapiens sensu lato ("in the broad sense"), as ancestral to modern humans and Neanderthals. In 1979, Stringer and Finnish anthropologist Björn Kurtén found that the Kabwe and Petralona skulls are associated with the Cromerian industry like the Mauer mandible, and thus postulated these three populations might be allied with each other. Though these fossils are poorly preserved and do not provide many comparable possible diagnostic traits (and likewise it was difficult at the time to properly define a unique species), they argued that at least these Middle Pleistocene specimens should be allocated to H. (s.?) heidelbergensis or "H. (s.?) rhodesiensis" (depending on, respectively, the inclusion or exclusion of the Mauer mandible) to formally recognise their similarity.

Further work most influentially by Stringer, palaeoanthropologist Ian Tattersall, and human evolutionary biologist Phillip Rightmire reported further differences between Middle Pleistocene Afro-European specimens and H. erectus sensu stricto ("in the strict sense", in this case specimens from East Asia). Consequently, Afro-European remains from 600 to 300 thousand years ago—most notably from Kabwe, Petralona, Bodo and Arago—are often classified as H. heidelbergensis. In 2010, American physical anthropologist Jeffrey H. Schwartz and Tattersall suggested classifying all Middle Pleistocene European as well as Asian specimens—namely from Dali and Jinniushan in China—as H. heidelbergensis. This model is not as universally accepted. After the 2010 identification of the genetic code of some unique archaic human species in Siberia, termed "Denisovans" pending diagnostic fossil finds, it is postulated that the Asian remains could represent that same species. Thus, Middle Pleistocene Asian specimens, such as Dali Man or the Indian Narmada Man, remain enigmatic. The palaeontology institute at Heidelberg University, where the Mauer mandible has been kept since 1908, changed the label from H. e. heidelbergensis to H. heidelbergensis in 2015.

In 1976 at Sima de los Huesos (SH) in the Sierra de Atapuerca, Spain, Spanish palaeontologists Emiliano Aguirre, José María Basabe and Trinidad Torres began to excavate archaic human remains. Their investigation of the site was prompted by the finding of several bear remains (Ursus deningeri) since the early 20th century by amateur cavers (which consequently destroyed some of the human remains in that section). By 1990, about 600 human remains were reported, and by 2004 the number had increased to roughly 4,000. These represent at least 28 individuals, of which possibly only one is a child, and the rest teenagers and young adults. The fossil assemblage is exceptionally complete, with whole corpses buried rapidly, with all bodily elements represented. In 1997, Spanish palaeoanthropologist Juan Luis Arsuaga assigned these to H. heidelbergensis, but in 2014, he retracted this, stating that Neanderthal-like features present in the Mauer mandible are missing in the SH humans.

Classification 
In palaeoanthropology, the Middle Pleistocene is often termed the "muddle in the middle" because the species-level classification of archaic human remains from this time period has been heavily debated. The ancestors of modern humans (Homo sapiens or H. s. sapiens) and Neanderthals (H. neanderthalensis or H. s. neanderthalensis) diverged during this time period, and, by convention, H. heidelbergensis is typically considered the last common ancestor (LCA). This would make H. heidelbergensis a member of a chronospecies. It is much debated if the name H. heidelbergensis can be extended to Middle Pleistocene humans across the Old World, or if it is better to restrict it to just Europe. In the latter case, Middle Pleistocene African remains can be split off into "H. rhodesiensis". In the latter view, "H. rhodesiensis" can either be seen as the direct ancestor of modern humans, or of "H. helmei" which evolved into modern humans.

Regarding the Middle Pleistocene European remains, some are more firmly placed on the Neanderthal line (namely SH, Pontnewyyd, Steinheim, and Swanscombe), whereas others seem to have few uniquely Neanderthal features (Arago, Ceprano, Vértesszőlős, Bilzingsleben, Mala Balanica and Aroeira). Because of this, it is suggested there were multiple lineages (or species) in this region and time period, but French palaeoanthropologist Jean-Jacques Hublin considers this an unjustified extrapolation as they may have simply been different but still interconnected populations of a single, highly variable species. In 2015, Marie Antoinette de Lumley suggested the less derived material can also be split off into their own species or a subspecies of H. erectus s. l. (for example, the Arago material as "H. e. tautavelensis"). In 2018, Mirjana Roksandic and colleagues revised the hypodigm of H. heidelbergensis to include only the specimens with no Neanderthal-derived traits (namely Mauer, Mala Balanica, Ceprano, HaZore'a and Nadaouiyeh Aïn Askar). There is no defined distinction between latest potential H. heidelbergensis material – specifically Steinheim and SH – and the earliest Neanderthal specimens—Biache, France; Ehringsdorf, Germany; or Saccopastore, Italy.

The use of the Mauer mandible, an isolated jawbone, as the type specimen for the species has been problematic as it does not present many diagnostic features, and in addition it is missing from several Middle Pleistocene specimens. Anthropologist William Straus said on this topic that, "While the skull is the creation of God, the jaw is the work of the devil." If the Mauer mandible is actually a member of a different species than the Kabwe skull and most other Afro-European Middle Pleistocene archaic humans, then "H. rhodesiensis" would take priority as the name of the LCA.

In 2021, Canadian anthropologist Mirjana Roksandic and colleagues recommended the complete dissolution of H. heidelbergensis and "H. rhodesiensis", as the name rhodesiensis honours English diamond magnate Cecil Rhodes who disenfranchised the black population in southern Africa. They classified all European H. heidelbergensis as H. neanderthalensis, and synonymised H. rhodesiensis with a new species they named "H. bodoensis" which includes all African specimens, and potentially some from the Levant and the Balkans which have no Neanderthal-derived traits (namely Ceprano, Mala Balanica, HaZore'a and Nadaouiyeh Aïn Askar). H. bodoensis is supposed to represent the immediate ancestor of modern humans, but does not include the LCA of modern humans and Neanderthals. They suggested the confusing morphology of the Middle Pleistocene was caused by periodic H. bodoensis migration events into Europe following population collapses after glacial cycles, interbreeding with surviving indigenous populations. Their taxonomic recommendations were rejected by Stringer and others as they failed to explain how exactly their proposals would resolve anything, in addition to violating nomenclatural rules.

Evolution 
H. heidelbergensis is thought to have descended from African H. erectus — sometimes classified as Homo ergaster — during the first early expansions of hominins out of Africa beginning roughly 2 million years ago. Those that dispersed across Europe and stayed in Africa evolved into H. heidelbergensis or speciated into H. heidelbergensis in Europe and "H. rhodesiensis" in Africa, and those that dispersed across East Asia evolved into H. erectus s. s. The exact derivation from an ancestor species is obfuscated by a long gap in the human fossil record near the end of the Early Pleistocene. In 2016, Antonio Profico and colleagues suggested that 875,000-year-old skull materials from the Gombore II site of the Melka Kunture Formation, Ethiopia, represent a transitional morph between H. ergaster and H. heidelbergensis, and thus postulated that H. heidelbergensis originated in Africa instead of Europe.

According to genetic analysis, the LCA of modern humans and Neanderthal split into a modern human line, and a Neanderthal/Denisovan line, and the latter later split into Neanderthal and Denisovans. According to nuclear DNA analysis, the 430,000-year-old SH humans are more closely related to Neanderthals than Denisovans (and that the Neanderthal/Denisovan, and thus the modern human/Neanderthal split, had already occurred), suggesting the modern human/Neanderthal LCA had existed long before many European specimens typically assigned to H. heidelbergensis did, such as the Arago and Petralona materials.

In 1997, Spanish archaeologist , Arsuaga, and colleagues described the roughly million-year-old H. antecessor from Gran Dolina, Sierra de Atapuerca, and suggested supplanting this species in the place of H. heidelbergensis for the LCA between modern humans and Neanderthals, with H. heidelbergensis descending from it and being a strictly European species ancestral to only Neanderthals. They later recanted. In 2020, Dutch molecular palaeoanthropologist Frido Welker and colleagues analysed ancient proteins collected from an H. antecessor tooth found that it was a member of a sister lineage to the LCA rather than being the LCA itself (that is, H. heidelbergensis did not derive from H. antecessor).

Human dispersal beyond 45°N seems to have been quite limited during the Lower Palaeolithic, with evidence of short-lived dispersals northward beginning after a million years ago. Beginning 700,000 years ago, more permanent populations seem to have persisted across the line coinciding with the spread of hand axe technology across Europe, possibly associated with the dispersal of H. heidelbergensis and behavioural shifts to cope with the cold climate. Such occupation becomes much more frequent after 500,000 years ago.

Anatomy

Skull 

In comparison to Early Pleistocene H. erectus/ergaster, Middle Pleistocene humans have a much more modern human-like face. The nasal opening is set completely vertically in the skull, and the anterior nasal sill can be crested or sometimes a prominent spine. The incisive canals (on the roof of the mouth) open near the teeth, and are orientated like those of more recent human species. The frontal bone is broad, the parietal bone can be expanded, and the squamous part of temporal bone is high and arched, which could all be related to increasing brain size. The sphenoid bone features a spine extending downwards, and the articular tubercle on the underside of the skull can jut out prominently as the surface behind the jaw hinge is otherwise quite flat.

In 2004, Rightmire estimated the brain volumes of ten Middle Pleistocene humans variously attributable to H. heidelbergensis—from Kabwe, Bodo, Ndutu, Dali, Jinniushan, Petralona, Steinheim, Arago, and two from SH. This set gives an average volume of about 1,206 cc, ranging from 1,100 to 1,390 cc. He also averaged the brain volumes of 30 H. erectus/ergaster specimens, spanning nearly 1.5 million years from across East Asia and Africa, as 973 cc, and thus concluded a significant jump in brain size, though conceded brain size was extremely variable ranging from 727 to 1,231 cc depending on the time period, geographic region, and even between individuals within the same population (the last one probably due to notable sexual dimorphism with males much bigger than females). In comparison, for modern humans, brain size averages 1,270 cc for males and 1,130 cc for females; and for Neanderthals 1,600 cc for males and 1,300 cc for females.

In 2009, palaeontologists Aurélien Mounier, François Marchal and Silvana Condemi published the first differential diagnosis of H. heidelbergensis using the Mauer mandible, as well as material from Tighennif, Algeria; SH, Spain; Arago, France; and Montmaurin, France. They listed the diagnostic traits as: a reduced chin, a notch in the submental space (near the throat), parallel upper and lower boundaries of the mandible in side-view, several mental foramina (small holes for blood vessels) near the cheek teeth, a horizontal retromolar space (a gap behind the molars), a gutter between the molars and the ramus (which juts up to connect with the skull), an overall long jaw, a deep fossa (a depression) for the masseter muscle (which closes the jaw), a small gonial angle (the angle between the body of the mandible and the ramus), an extensive planum alveolare (the distance from the frontmost tooth socket to the back of the jaw), a developed planum triangulare (near the jaw hinge), and a mylohyoid line originating at the level of the third molar.

Size
Trends in body size through the Middle Pleistocene are obscured due to a general lack of limb bones and non-skull (post-cranial) remains. A tibia from Kabwe is typically estimated to have been , among the tallest Middle Pleistocene specimens, but it is possible this individual was either unusually large or had a much longer tibia to femur ratio than expected.

If these specimens are representative of their respective continents, they would suggest that above-medium to tall people were prevalent throughout the Middle Pleistocene Old World.

If so, the individual from the Berg Aukas Mine would probably have had proportions similar to Kabwe 1.

Build 
The human body plan had evolved in H. ergaster, and characterises all later Homo species, but among the more derived members there are 2 distinct morphs: A narrow-chested and gracile build like modern humans, and a broader-chested and robust build like Neanderthals. It was once assumed that the Neanderthal build was unique to Neanderthals based on the gracile H. ergaster partial skeleton "KNM WT-15000" ("Turkana Boy"), but the discovery of some Middle Pleistocene skeletal elements (though generally fragmentary and few and far between) seems to suggest Middle Pleistocene humans overall featured a more Neanderthal morph. Thus, the modern human morph may be unique to modern humans, evolving quite recently. This is most clearly demonstrated in the exceptionally well-preserved SH assemblage. Based on skull robustness, it was assumed Middle Pleistocene humans featured a high degree of sexual dimorphism, but the SH humans demonstrate a modern humanlike level.

The SH humans and other Middle Pleistocene Homo have a more basal pelvis and femur (more similar to earlier Homo than Neanderthals). The overall broad and elliptical pelvis is broader, taller and thicker (expanded anteroposteriorly) than those of Neanderthals or modern humans, and retains an anteriorly located acetabulocristal buttress (which supports the iliac crests during hip abduction), a well defined supraacetabular groove (between the hip socket and the ilium), and a thin and rectangular superior pubic ramus (as opposed to the thick, stout one in modern humans). The foot of all archaic humans has a taller trochlea of the ankle bone, making the ankle more flexible (specifically dorsiflexion and plantarflexion).

Pathology 
On the left side of its face, an SH skull (Skull 5) presents the oldest-known case of orbital cellulitis (eye infection which developed from an abscess in the mouth). This probably caused sepsis, killing the individual.

A male SH pelvis (Pelvis 1), based on joint degeneration, may have lived for more than 45 years, making him one of the oldest examples of this demographic in the human fossil record. The frequency of 45-plus individuals gradually increases with time, but has overall remained quite low throughout the Palaeolithic. He similarly had the age-related maladies lumbar kyphosis (excessive curving of the lumbar vertebrae of the lower back), L5–S1 spondylolisthesis (misalignment of the last lumbar vertebra with the first sacral vertebra), and Baastrup disease on L4 and 5 (enlargement of the spinous processes). These would have produced lower back pain, significantly limiting movement, and may be evidence of group care.

An adolescent SH skull (Cranium 14) was diagnosed with lambdoid single suture craniosynostosis (immature closing of the left lambdoid suture, leading to skull deformities as development continued). This is a rare condition, occurring in less than 6 out of every 200,000 individuals in modern humans. The individual died around the age of 10, suggesting it was not abandoned due its deformity as has been done in historical times, and received the same quality of care as any other child.

Enamel hypoplasia on the teeth is used to determine bouts of nutritional stress. At a rate of 40% for the SH humans, this is significantly higher than exhibited in the earlier South African hominin Paranthropus robustus at Swartkrans (30.6%) or Sterkfontein (12.1%). Nonetheless, Neanderthals suffered even higher rates and more intense bouts of hypoplasia, but it is unclear if this is because Neanderthals were less capable of exploiting natural resources, or because they lived in harsher environments. A peak at 3½ years of age may be correlated with weaning age. In Neanderthals this peak was at 4 years, and many modern hunter gatherers also wean at about 4 years of age.

Culture

Food

Middle Pleistocene communities in general seem to have eaten big game at a higher frequency than predecessors, with meat becoming an essential dietary component. Diet could overall be varied—for example the inhabitants of Terra Amata seem to have been mainly eating deer, but also elephants, boar, ibex, rhino and aurochs. African sites typically commonly yield bovine and horse bones. Though carcasses may have simply been scavenged, some Afro-European sites show specific targeting of a single species, which more likely indicates active hunting; for example: Olorgesailie, Kenya, which has yielded over 50 to 60 individual baboons (Theropithecus oswaldi); and Torralba and Ambrona in Spain which have an abundance of elephant bones (though also rhino and large hoofed mammals). The increase in meat subsistence could indicate the development of group hunting strategies in the Middle Pleistocene. For instance, at Torralba and Ambrona, the animals may have been run into swamplands before being killed, entailing encircling and driving by a large group of hunters in a coordinated and organised attack. Exploitation of aquatic environments is generally quite lacking, despite some sites being in close proximity to the ocean, lakes or rivers.

Plants were probably also frequently consumed, including seasonally available ones, but the extent of their exploitation is unclear as they do not fossilise as well as animal bones. Assuming a diet heavy in lean meat, an individual would have needed a high carbohydrate intake to prevent protein poisoning, such as by eating typically abundant underground storage organs, tree bark, berries, or nuts. The Schöningen site, Germany, has over 200 plants in the vicinity which are either edible raw or when cooked.

Art

Upper Palaeolithic modern humans are well known for having etched engravings seemingly with symbolic value. As of 2018, only 27 Middle and Lower Palaeolithic objects have been postulated to have symbolic etching, out of which some have been refuted as having been caused by natural or otherwise non-symbolic phenomena (such as the fossilisation or excavation processes). The Lower Palaeolithic ones are: three 380,000-year-old pebbles from Terra Amata; a 250,000-year-old pebble from Markkleeberg, Germany; 18 roughly 200,000-year-old pebbles from Lazaret (near Terra Amata); a roughly 200,000-year-old lithic from Grotte de l'Observatoire, Monaco; a 370,000-year-old bone from Bilzingsleben, Germany; and a 200- to 130-thousand-year-old pebble from Baume Bonne, France.

In the mid-19th century, French archaeologist Jacques Boucher de Crèvecœur de Perthes began excavation at St. Acheul, Amiens, France, (the area where the Acheulian was defined), and, in addition to hand axes, reported perforated sponge fossils (Porosphaera globularis) which he considered to have been decorative beads. This claim was completely ignored. In 1894, English archaeologist Worthington George Smith discovered 200 similar perforated fossils in Bedfordshire, England, and also speculated that their function was beads, though he made no reference to Boucher de Perthes' find, possibly because he was unaware of it. In 2005, Robert Bednarik reexamined the material, and concluded that—because all the Bedfordshire P. globularis fossils are sub-spherical and range  in diameter, despite this species having a highly variable shape—they were deliberately chosen. They appear to have been bored through completely or almost completely by some parasitic creature (i. e., through natural processes), and were then percussed on what would have been the more closed-off end to fully open the hole. He also found wear facets which he speculated were begotten from clacking against other beads when they were strung together and worn as a necklace. In 2009, Solange Rigaud, Francisco d'Errico and colleagues noticed that the modified areas are lighter in colour than the unmodifed, suggesting they were inflicted much more recently such as during excavation. They were also unconvinced that the fossils could be confidently associated with the Acheulian artefacts from the sites, and suggested that—as an alternative to archaic human activity—apparent size-selection could have been caused by either natural geological processes or 19th-century collectors favouring this specific form.

Early modern humans and late Neanderthals (the latter especially after 60,000 years ago) made wide use of red ochre for presumably symbolic purposes as it produces a blood-like colour, though ochre can also have a functional medicinal application. Beyond these two species, ochre usage is recorded at Olduvai Gorge, Tanzania, where two red ochre lumps have been found; Ambrona where an ochre slab was trimmed down into a specific shape; and Terra Amata where 75 ochre pieces were heated to achieve a wide colour range from yellow to red-brown to red. These may exemplify early and isolated instances of colour preference and colour categorisation, and such practices may not have been normalised yet.

In 2006, Eudald Carbonell and Marina Mosquera suggested the  Sima de los Huesos (SH) hominins were buried by people rather than being the victims of some catastrophic event such as a cave-in, because young children and infants are absent which would be unexpected if this were a single and complete family unit. The SH humans are conspicuously associated with only a single stone tool, a carefully crafted hand axe made of high-quality quartzite (rarely used in the region), and so Carbonell and Mosquera postulated this was purposefully and symbolically placed with the bodies as some kind of grave good. Supposed evidence of symbolic graves would not surface for another 300,000 years.

Technology

Stone tools 
The Lower Palaeolithic (Early Stone Age) comprises the Oldowan which was replaced by the Acheulian, which is characterised by the production of mostly symmetrical hand axes. The Acheulian has a timespan of about a million years, and such technological stagnation has typically been ascribed to comparatively limited cognitive abilities which significantly reduced innovative capacity, such as a deficit in cognitive fluidity, working memory, or a social system compatible with apprenticeship. Nonetheless, the Acheulian does seem to subtly change over time, and is typically split up into Early Acheulian and Late Acheulian, the latter becoming especially popular after 600 to 500 thousand years ago. Late Acheulian technology never crossed over east of the Movius Line into East Asia, which is generally believed to be due to either some major deficit in cultural transmission (namely smaller population size in the East) or simply preservation bias as far fewer stone tool assemblages are found east of the line.

The transition is indicated by the production of smaller, thinner, and more symmetrical hand axes (though thicker, less refined ones were still produced). At the 500,000-year-old Boxgrove site in England—an exceptionally well-preserved site with abundance of tool remains—thinning may have been produced by striking the hand axe near-perpendicularly with a soft hammer, possible with the invention of prepared platforms for tool making. The Boxgrove knappers also left behind large lithic flakes leftover from making hand axes, possibly with the intention of recycling them into other tools later. Late Acheulian sites elsewhere pre-prepared lithic cores ("Large Flake Blanks," LFB) in a variety of ways before shaping them into tools, making prepared platforms unnecessary. LFB Acheulian spreads out of Africa into West and South Asia before a million years ago and is present in Southern Europe after 600,000 years ago, but northern Europe (and the Levant after 700,000 years ago) made use of soft hammers as they mainly made use of small, thick flint nodules. The first prepared platforms in Africa come from the 450,000-year-old Fauresmith industry, transitional between the Early Stone Age (Acheulian) and the Middle Stone Age.

With either method, knappers (tool makers) would have had to have produced some item indirectly related to creating the desired product (hierarchical organisation), which could represent a major cognitive development. Experiments with modern humans have shown that platform preparation cannot be learned through purely observational learning, unlike earlier techniques, and could be indicative of well developed teaching methods as well as self-regulated learning. At Boxgrove, the knappers used not only stone but also bone and antler to make hammers, and the use of such a wide range of raw materials could speak to advanced planning capabilities as stoneworking requires a much different skillset to work and gather materials for than boneworking.

The Kapthurin Formation, Kenya, has yielded the oldest evidence of blade and bladelet technology, dating to 545 to 509 thousand years ago. This technology is rare even in the Middle Palaeolithic, and is typically associated with Upper Palaeolithic modern humans. It is unclear if this is part of a long blade-making tradition, or if blade technology was lost and reinvented several times by multiple different human species.

Fire and construction 

Despite apparent pushes into colder climates, evidence of fire is scarce in the archaeological record until 400 to 300 thousand years ago. Though it is possible fire remnants simply degraded, long and overall undisturbed occupation sequences such as at Arago or Gran Dolina conspicuously lack convincing evidence of fire usage. This pattern could possibly indicate the invention of ignition technology or improved fire maintenance techniques at this time, and that fire was not an integral part of people's lives before then in Europe. In Africa, on the other hand, humans may have been able to frequently scavenge fire as early as 1.6 million years ago from natural wildfires, which occur much more often in Africa, thus possibly (more or less) regularly using fire. The oldest established continuous fire site beyond Africa is the 780,000-year-old Gesher Benot Ya'aqov, Israel.

In Europe, evidence of constructed dwelling structures—classified as firm surface huts with solid foundations built in areas mostly sheltered from the weather—has been recorded since the Cromerian Interglacial, the earliest example a 700,000-year-old stone foundation from Přezletice, Czech Republic. This dwelling probably featured a vaulted roof made of thick branches or thin poles, supported by a foundation of big rocks and earth. Other such dwellings have been postulated to have existed during or following the Holstein Interglacial (which began 424,000 years ago) in Bilzingsleben, Germany; Terra Amata, France; and Fermanville and Saint-Germain-des-Vaux in Normandy. These were probably occupied during the winter, and, averaging only  in area, they were probably only used for sleeping in, while other activities (including firekeeping) seem to have been done outside. Less-permanent tent technology may have been present in Europe in the Lower Paleolithic.

Spears 

The appearance of repeated fire usage—earliest in Europe from Beeches Pit, England, and Schöningen, Germany—roughly coincides with hafting technology (attaching stone points to spears) best exemplified by the Schöningen spears. These nine wooden spears and spear fragments—in addition to a lance, and a double-pointed stick—date to 300,000 years ago and were preserved along a lakeside. The spears were made of soft spruce wood, except for spear 4 which was (also soft) pine wood. This contrasts with the Clacton spearhead from Clacton-on-Sea, England, perhaps roughly 100,000 years older, which was made of hard yew wood. Besides these two localities, the only other site which provides solid evidence of European spear technology is the 120,000-year-old Lehringen site, Germany, where a  yew spear was apparently lodged in an elephant. In Africa, 500,000-year-old points from Kathu Pan 1, South Africa, may have been hafted onto spears. Judging by indirect evidence, a horse scapula from the 500,000-year-old Boxgrove shows a puncture wound consistent with a spear wound. Evidence of hafting (in both Europe and Africa) becomes much more common after 300,000 years.

Language 

The SH humans had a modern humanlike hyoid bone (which supports the tongue), and middle ear bones capable of finely distinguishing frequencies within the range of normal human speech. Judging by dental striations, they seem to have been predominantly right-handed, and handedness is related to the lateralisation of brain function, typically associated with language processing in modern humans. So, it is postulated that this population was speaking with some early form of language. Nonetheless, these traits do not absolutely prove the existence of language and humanlike speech, and its presence so early in time despite such anatomical arguments has been primarily opposed by cognitive scientist Philip Lieberman.

See also 

 Altamura Man
 Ceprano Man
 Dmanisi hominins
 Early European modern humans
 Homo rhodesiensis
 Homo antecessor
 Swanscombe Heritage Park
 Tautavel Man
Tunel Wielki

References

External links 

 Homo heidelbergensis – The Smithsonian Institution's Human Origins Program
 Homepage of Mauer 1 Club
 UNESCO World Heritage Centre - Archaeological Site of Atapuerca
 Human Timeline (Interactive) – Smithsonian, National Museum of Natural History (August 2016).

 
Fossil taxa described in 1908